Kenneth Warren may refer to:

Kenneth Warren (cricketer) (1926-2008), Barbadian cricketer
Kenneth Warren (politician) (1926–2019), British politician
Kenneth F. Warren, American professor of political science at Saint Louis University
Kenneth J. Warren (1929–1973), Australian actor
Kenneth S. Warren (1929–1996), American scientist
Kenneth W. Warren (born 1957), American professor of English at the University of Chicago